Sir John Marmion, Baron Marmion of Winteringham was an Anglo-Norman baron who represented Lincolnshire in Parliament and fought in the Wars of Scottish Independence.

Ancestry

He was the son and heir of Sir John Marmion, 3rd Baron Marmion of Winteringham & Isabella and was born c.1292.

Career and life

John was an adherent of the king's cousin and rival Thomas, 2nd Earl of Lancaster and on 16 October 1313 was pardoned for his role in the death of Piers Gaveston. He again found himself in trouble in 1314 when an arrest warrant was issued for both John and his father who led a group of dozens of men on a raid upon the Abbot of Fountains Abbey's land at Aldeburgh and Balderby, Yorkshire. Timber, two hundred sheep, fifty oxen and four carts were stolen and the Abbot's servants suffered kidnapping, beatings, cuts and had their beards plucked out. The Abbot and his monks may not have been entirely innocent having themselves been accused of violent assault in 1307 and of stealing deer in 1316.

In May 1314 John was summoned to serve in Sir Henry Tyes' company at the Battle of Bannockburn. Following the disastrous defeat Robert the Bruce and his armies swept south and John was again summoned to defend the north against the rampant Scots at Berwick-upon-Tweed on 30 June 1314.

He joined John de Mowbray's company in Aymer de Valence's attempt to re-capture Berwick in August 1319 which led to the Battle of Myton and a two-year truce.

His father died at or shortly after the Battle of Boroughbridge in 1322 whereupon John Jnr took over his father's lands. This was at a time when the Fens were gradually becoming flooded and at least one of John's meadows at Cherry Willingham sank under water.

Robert the Bruce used Boroughbridge as an opportunity to invade eighty miles into the north-west of England plundering and burning towns such as Lancaster and Preston as he went. In the last half of 1322 John was summoned to help repel Bruce and drive him back into Scotland where he operated a scorched earth policy to deprive the English of food. Hunger and dysentery forced King Edward to withdraw his forces back to York. Marmion was stationed there in May 1323 when a thirteen-year truce was agreed between King Edward and Bruce.

John was summoned to a Great Council at Westminster in May 1324 as a Knight of Gloucestershire, Yorkshire and Lindsey, Lincolnshire.

He accompanied John de Warenne, 7th Earl of Surrey and Queen Isabella in their negotiations with King Charles IV of France in Gascony in March 1325. Rather than returning to England Isabella stayed in France where she embarked upon an affair with Roger Mortimer, 1st Earl of March and formed a plot to oust her husband, Edward II, from the throne. The plot was successful and Isabella called a Parliament in January 1327, which was attended by John Marmion, and which ratified Isabella's eldest son Edward III as the new king.

In April 1327 John was sued by William de Paris (a former MP for Lincs) for the wardship of William, the underage son and heir of the late Leicestershire MP and knight Sir William Marmion (a leading candidate to be the Knight of Norham Castle fame) and his land at Keisby, Lincs.

When the Queen and Roger Mortimer gathered a vast army at York in July 1327 John joined them. The campaign saw little fighting and after the Battle of Stanhope Park the English army returned to York and disbanded.

On 25 May 1329 John was granted protection for three years to go on pilgrimage to the Holy Land. Deer were stolen from his park at Tanfield in his absence and an arrest warrant to catch the thieves was issued on 11 October 1331.

He was appointed to arrest all disturbers of the peace in Sussex on 21 March 1332, shortly before the start of the Second War of Scottish Independence.

Sir John died in 1335, the year of Edward III's 'Great Invasion of Scotland' and the Battle of Boroughmuir.

Family and descendants
John first married Elizabeth before then marrying Maud daughter of Thomas, 1st Lord Furnival and had the following children:

 Robert Marmion (d.s.p. 1360) Of infirm condition and never summoned to Parliament.
 Joan Marmion (d.1362), m1. John Bernack m2. John Folville. son of John de Folville (1286-1329) and Mabel de la Mare of Ashby Mears, Northamptonshire.
 Avice Marmion, 2nd wife of John de Grey, K.G. of Rotherfield. Issue John and Robert adopted the Marmion name and their Fitz-Hugh descendants became the eventual heirs of the lands at Winteringham, Tanfield, etc. They were ancestors to Queen Catherine Parr, sixth wife of Henry VIII of England.

Notes

References

Bibliography

External links
 Marmion Tombs in Winteringham Church
  – Possible site of Marmion Hermitage Manor House at West Tanfield
 

1292 births
1335 deaths
13th-century English people
English MPs 1324
English people of French descent
People from the Borough of North Lincolnshire
4